Lankesh Patrike is a 2003 Indian Kannada-language political thriller film directed by Indrajit Lankesh and starring Darshan and newcomer Vasundhara Das. Darshan played a journalist in the film and actor/singer Vasundhara Das made her Kannada debut with this film. Despite releasing to positive critical reception, the film was a box office failure.

Cast 
Darshan as Indra
Vasundhara Das as Preeti
Ananth Nag as Lankesh
Rangayana Raghu as the CM
Devaraj as ACP Ramu
Loknath
Anupama Gowda

Soundtrack
The music of the film was composed by Babji-Sandeep and lyrics written by K. Kalyan, Sri Ranga and Dodda Rangegowda.

Awards
Karnataka State Film Award for Best Editor - B. Kemparaju

References

External links

2003 films
2000s Kannada-language films
Films directed by Indrajit Lankesh